Qatar participated at the 2018 Summer Youth Olympics in Buenos Aires, Argentina from 6 October to 18 October 2018. Qatar had 5 competitors and won two gold medals.

Athletics

Equestrian

Qatar qualified a rider based on its ranking in the FEI World Jumping Challenge Rankings.

 Individual Jumping - 1 athlete

References

2018 in Qatari sport
Nations at the 2018 Summer Youth Olympics
Qatar at the Youth Olympics